The Tondern raid or Operation F.7, was a British bombing raid mounted by the Royal Navy and Royal Air Force against the Imperial German Navy airship base at Tønder, Denmark, then a part of Germany. The airships were used for the strategic bombing of Britain. It was the first attack in history by aircraft from an aircraft carrier.  On 19 July 1918, seven Sopwith Camels took off from the converted battlecruiser . For the loss of one man and several aircraft, the British destroyed Zeppelins L 54, L 60 and a captive balloon.

Background
In March 1918 the battlecruiser  joined the Grand Fleet at Scapa Flow, flying the flag of the Rear Admiral Commanding Aircraft, Richard Phillimore. Furious had been converted for use as an aircraft carrier during her construction, with a flight deck forward of her main superstructure. During 1917 the carrier had been equipped with Sopwith Camel 2F.1a, naval variant of the Sopwith Camel.  These partially replaced the Sopwith 1½ Strutter. In late 1917 a second flight deck was fitted aft, landing on which proved "almost as hazardous as ditching in the sea". Until such need arose she was dispatched on reconnaissance missions off the Heligoland Bight, searching for minefields and looking for evidence of counter-mining by the Germans.

While Britain, Japan, and Russia had all performed ship-based air raids as early as 1914, these were performed by seaplanes lowered into the water using cranes. The Furious, by contrast, was designed to launch its aircraft directly with an onboard catapult.

An attack on the bases of the Naval Airship Division of the Imperial German Navy was allegedly suggested to Rear Admiral Phillimore by his Royal Air Force staff officer Lieutenant-Colonel Robert Clark-Hall and one of his pilots, Squadron Commander Richard Bell-Davies, VC. Clark-Hall received Phillimore's approval and that of the Commander-in-Chief of the Grand Fleet, Admiral David Beatty.

Operation F.6
It was originally planned to use 1½ Strutters in an attack but these were too valuable for reconnaissance and Sopwith Camels were substituted, whose range meant an attack on the airship base at Tønder. The initial attack on Tønder, named Operation F.6 called for two waves of four aircraft, each pilot receiving special training. One of the pilots, Major Moore, was posted away before the operation's scheduled date of 29 June 1918, by which time it was too late to train a replacement. Training consisted of bombing runs on the airfield at Turnhouse, where the outlines of Tondern's three airship sheds were marked. The pilots were Captains W. D. Jackson, William Dickson, Bernard Smart and T. K. Thyne, and Lieutenants N. E. Williams, S. Dawson and W. A. Yeulett. On 27 June Furious put to sea from Rosyth, escorted by the 1st Light Cruiser Squadron and eight destroyers from the 13th Destroyer Flotilla. On 29 June the ships reached the flying off point but with Force 6 winds blowing flying was deemed impossible and the operation was called off.

Operation F.7
The mission was attempted again, renamed Operation F.7 and Furious sailed at 12:03 on 17 July. This time she was escorted by Force B, including a division of the 1st Battle Squadron (all the new Revenge-class battleships), the 7th Light Cruiser Squadron and a destroyer screen. s' "Y" turret guns had been loaded with a special shrapnel shell for use against airships. During the passage the destroyer  investigated a reported submarine contact but nothing came of it.

At 03:04 in the morning of 18 July Furious was ready to fly off her Camels when a thunderstorm struck. Rather than cancel the operation, it was decided to delay it twenty-four hours and Furious and her destroyer screen fell back on Force B. The combined squadron cruised out of sight off the Danish coast until the morning of 19 July and in worsening weather conditions Furious flew off her Camels between 03:13 and 03:21. The first flight consisted of Jackson, Dickson and Williams; the second of Smart, Dawson, Yeulett and Thyne. Thyne was forced to turn around with engine trouble before reaching the target and ditched his aircraft before being recovered.

The first three aircraft arrived over Tondern at 04:35, taking the base by surprise. , the largest, was a double shed and housed the airships L.54 and L.60.  contained a captive balloon and Toni was being dismantled. The first wave attacked  and hit the shed with three bombs, detonating the gas bags of L.54 and L.60, destroying them by fire but not causing them to explode and destroy the shed. Another bomb from the first wave hit  and damaged the balloon inside. The second wave destroyed the captive balloon afire and had several near misses on a wagon loaded with hydrogen cylinders. Despite the loss of the two airships only four men were injured.

During the attack ground fire was directed at both waves but the only damage was an undercarriage wheel shot off a Camel from the second wave. Williams, Jackson and Dawson, doubtful that they had sufficient fuel to reach the British squadron offshore, landed in Denmark. Dickson, Yuelett and Smart flew to sea to find the British ships. Dickson ditched at 05:55 and Smart, having suffered engine trouble, ditched at 06:30. Yeulett was not heard from again and presumed drowned; it was supposed that he had been forced to ditch prematurely through fuel exhaustion. The British squadron waited for the other pilots until the time when the Camels fuel would have run out, then after 07:00 the ships took cruising formation and made for home.

Aftermath

The German Naval Airship Division quickly had the double hangar, repaired but Tondern was abandoned, only to be used as an emergency landing site. Defences at the other bases were improved and a swathe of the countryside near Nordholz Naval Airbase was burned off to prevent it being set alight by bombs. The British conducted no other carrier raids during the war but other raids were planned. From 1917 a raid on the German High Seas Fleet was being planned using the new torpedo-carrying Sopwith Cuckoo. The Cuckoo was not available in sufficient numbers until early 1919 and the project was abortive. The concept was revived during the Second World War and eventually resulted in the Battle of Taranto a raid on the ships of the Italian  in 1940. Dickson and Yeulett were awarded the DSO, whilst Smart received the bar to his DSO. Yeulett's body was later recovered from the sea.

Notes

Footnotes

References

Further reading

External links

 "The Raid on Tondern: July 19th, 1918" Accessed 2008-03-08 
 "King George Visits the Mystery Ship; Goes Aboard Airplane Carrier Which Figured in Raid on Zeppelin Hangars." New York Times 1918-07-25

Military operations of World War I involving the United Kingdom
Military operations of World War I involving Germany
Royal Navy
History of the Royal Air Force during World War I
Aerial operations and battles of World War I
1918 in Germany
July 1918 events